Buzzfest is the name of two unrelated music festivals held in Houston, Texas and Nashville, Tennessee, United States. The Buzzfest in Houston is a bi-annual show hosted by the radio station 94.5 The Buzz while the Buzzfest in Nashville is an annual show (usually in the late summer) hosted by the radio station 102.9 The Buzz.

Buzzfest in Nashville

Past events
Buzzfest 2010 September 10, 2010'LP FieldShinedown, Seether, Papa Roach, Sick Puppies, Janus (Cancelled), November, Manic Bloom, Adalene, Forgotten Fable, Voodoo Prophet  Voodoo Prophet was officially the first metal band to ever play LP Field being the opening band for Buzzfest 2010. Following Voodoo Prophet, another Nashville based metal band named Forgotten Fable took the stage at 2010 Buzzfest shortly after the band was awarded a NIMA (Nashville Independent Music Awards) for "2010 Best Hard Rock Band", which is a prestigious award in Music City.

Buzzfest in Houston

Past events
Buzzfest I June 4, 1995Cynthia Woods Mitchell PavilionBush, Face to Face, Our Lady Peace, Maids of Gravity, Matthew Sweet, Modern English, Ned's Atomic Dustbin, The Nixons, No Use for a Name, Phunk Junkeez, POL
Buzzfest II April 20, 1996Cynthia Woods Mitchell PavilionGravity Kills, 22 Brides, Atticus Finch, God Lives Under Water, The Hunger, Lush, Modern English, The Nixons, Poe, Toadies, Too Much Joy
Buzzfest III August 30, 1997Cynthia Woods Mitchell PavilionAbra Moore, Artificial Joy Club, Buck O' Nine, Cowboy Mouth, Matchbox Twenty, Old 97's, Seven Mary Three, Silverchair
Buzzfest IV April 25, 1998Cynthia Woods Mitchell PavilionAthenaeum, Big Wreck, Black Lab, Bluebird, Cool 4 August, Creed, Face Plan, Foo Fighters, Mighty Joe Plumb, Our Lady Peace, RiverFenix, Los Skarnales, Spacehog, The Hunger, Train in Vain
Buzzfest V April 25, 1999Cynthia Woods Mitchell PavilionBetter Than Ezra, Chlorine, Collective Soul, Eve 6, The Flys, GPR, Jude, Lit, My Friend Steve, Soul Coughing, Sponge, Tin Star, Tommy Henrickson, Train
Buzzfest VI April 15, 2000Cynthia Woods Mitchell PavilionThe Flys, Frankie Machine, Joe 90, Lit, Mars Electric, Oleander, Owsley, Papa Roach, Peter Searcy, Radford, Stir, Stroke 9, Third Eye Blind, Tonic
Buzzfest VII April 22, 2001Cynthia Woods Mitchell PavilionColor, Dexter Freebish, Dust for Life, Electrasy, Eve 6, Linkin Park, Lucky Boys Confusion, The Offspring, Oleander, Orgy, Spacehog, Train
Buzzfest VIII November 17, 2001Cynthia Woods Mitchell Pavilion8stops7, Alien Ant Farm, The Apex Theory, Bliss 66, The Calling, Default, Fuel, Joydrop, Nickelback, Pressure 4-5, Remy Zero, Saliva, Tantric, Transmatic
Buzzfest IX April 21, 2002Cynthia Woods Mitchell Pavilion Thirty Seconds to Mars, Abandoned Pools, Adema, Course of Nature, Drowning Pool, Earshot, Gravity Kills, Mest, P.O.D., Pressure 4-5, Puddle of Mudd, Sum 41, Trik Turner, Unwritten Law
Buzzfest X October 27, 2002Cynthia Woods Mitchell PavilionAudiovent, Box Car Racer, Earshot, Everclear, The Exies, Filter (did not play), Greenwheel, H2O, Home Town Hero, Hoobastank, OK Go, Saliva, Seether, Sugarcult, The Used
Buzzfest XI May 10, 2003Cynthia Woods Mitchell PavilionThe All-American Rejects, Breaking Benjamin, Evanescence, The Exies, Godsmack, Maroon 5, Off by One, Powerman 5000, RA, Seether, Skrape, Systematic, Stone Sour, Taproot, Trapt, The Used
Buzzfest XII October 11, 2003Cynthia Woods Mitchell PavilionAlien Ant Farm, The Ataris, Billy Talent, Eve 6, Fountains of Wayne, Fuel, Staind, Static-X, Smile Empty Soul, Socialburn, Switchfoot, Three Days Grace, Trapt, Vendetta Red, Yellowcard
Buzzfest XIII April 17, 2004Cynthia Woods Mitchell PavilionCold, Drowning Pool, Everlast, Finger Eleven, Hoobastank, Ima Robot, Lo Pro, Lostprophets, Marcy Playground, Puddle of Mudd, Sevendust, Smile Empty Soul, Strata, Three Days Grace, Thornley, Thrice, Trapt
Buzzfest XIV October 30, 2004Cynthia Woods Mitchell PavilionAuthority Zero, Breaking Benjamin, Burden Brothers, Chevelle, Earshot, The Exies, My Chemical Romance, Papa Roach, Riddlin Kids, Seether, Shinedown, Skindred, Story of the Year, The Vanished, Velvet Revolver
Buzzfest XV April 23, 2005Cynthia Woods Mitchell Pavilion3 Doors Down, Alter Bridge, Breaking Benjamin, The Exies, Glass Intrepid, Mudvayne, No Address, Papa Roach, Snow Patrol, Sum 41, Theory of a Deadman, Trust Company, Unwritten Law, The Used, Wakefield
Buzzfest XVI October 22, 2005Cynthia Woods Mitchell Pavilion (originally scheduled to take place at Minute Maid Park but moved due to the Houston Astros reaching the World Series)10 Years, Thirty Seconds to Mars, Audioslave, Bloodhound Gang, Boys Night Out, Coheed and Cambria, Cold, Dredg, Fall Out Boy, Hinder, Institute, Motion City Soundtrack, Nickelback, Our Lady Peace, Panic! at the Disco, Seether, The Starting Line, Vaux, Yellowcard
Buzzfest XVII June 17, 2006Cynthia Woods Mitchell Pavilion10 Years, Blue October, Buckcherry, Brill and Hurt, Candlebox, Evans Blue, Hinder, Hoobastank, Huck Johns, Hurt, People in Planes, Shinedown, Staind, Three Days Grace, Trapt
Buzzfest XVIII October 8, 2006Cynthia Woods Mitchell PavilionAlice in Chains, Avenged Sevenfold, Boys Like Girls, Breaking Benjamin, Crossfade, Eighteen Visions, Evans Blue, Everclear, Hurt, Lostprophets, OK Go, Panic Channel, The Red Jumpsuit Apparatus, Stone Sour
Buzzfest XIX April 21, 2007Cynthia Woods Mitchell PavilionAutovein, Blue October, Buckcherry, Chevelle, The Exies, Finger Eleven, Hinder, Jet, Papa Roach, Puddle of Mudd, The Red Jumpsuit Apparatus, Saosin, Seether, Smile Empty Soul, Three Days Grace, The VanishedThe show sold-out within two hours.
Buzzfest XX October 28, 2007Cynthia Woods Mitchell PavilionAlter Bridge, Another Animal, The Bravery, Chris Cornell, Earshot, Evanescence, Evans Blue, Fair to Midland, Finger Eleven, Fuel, Glass Intrepid, Sick Puppies, The Smashing Pumpkins, The Starting Line, Sum 41
Buzzfest XXI April 26, 2008Cynthia Woods Mitchell Pavilion3 Doors Down, 10 Years, Atreyu, Billy Talent, Chevelle, Filter, Finger Eleven, My Chemical Romance, Puddle of Mudd, Red, Seether, Sick Puppies, Story of the Year, Theory of a Deadman
Buzzfest XXII May 10, 2009Cynthia Woods Mitchell Pavilion Buzzfest XXII was originally scheduled for October 26, 2008 at the Cynthia Woods Mitchell Pavilion but extensive damage from Hurricane Ike forced its cancellation. The event was subsequently rescheduled for the same day at the Verizon Wireless Theater as The Buzz 94.5's First Annual Better Than Nothing Show. Appearing from the original Buzzfest XXII lineup were: 10 Years, Earshot, Hawthorne Heights, Merriwether, The Offspring, and Saving Abel. (The cancelled lineup from the Woodlands was 10 Years, Drive A, Earshot, Hawthorne Heights, Ludo, Merriwether, The Offspring, Papa Roach, Puddle of Mudd, Saving Abel, Seether, Staind, and The Toadies.)

Due to the cancellation of the Fall 2008 show, the Spring 2009 show was called Buzzfest XXII (instead of Buzzfest XXIII). It was scheduled for Sunday May 10, 2009 at the Cynthia Woods Mitchell Pavilion. A line-up and announcement party was scheduled for Thursday March 12, 2009 during a live broadcast with Dan Jantzen from 3 pm to 7 pm at House of Blues in Downtown Houston.

The line-up was Korn, Shinedown, 311, The Red Jumpsuit Apperatus, Papa Roach, 10 Years, Blue October, Hoobastank, Theory of a Deadman, Anberlin, The Toadies, Framing Hanley, Electric touch, Aranda

Buzzfest XXIII October 24, 2009Cynthia Woods Mitchell Pavilion Appearing were Alice in Chains, Puddle of Mudd, Chevelle, Jet, Our Lady Peace, Saving Abel, The Veer Union, Billy Boy on Poison, Janus, Tantric, Framing Hanley, and Earshot
Buzzfest XXIV May 2, 2010Cynthia Woods Mitchell PavilionMain Stage: Limp Bizkit, Three Days Grace, Thirty Seconds to Mars, Seether, Deftones, Switchfoot, Metric.Side Stage: Flyleaf, Sick Puppies, Cage the Elephant, 10 Years, Violent Soho, Crash Kings, Anchored.The show sold-out within 15 minutes.
Buzzfest XXV October 23, 2010Cynthia Woods Mitchell PavilionAppearing were Godsmack, Bush, Seether, Papa Roach, Finger Eleven, Filter, Anberlin, Sick Puppies, The Dirty Heads, Saving Abel, Paper Tongues, Neon Trees, New Politics and Civil Twilight.
Buzzfest XXVI Sunday, May 1, 2011Cynthia Woods Mitchell PavilionMain Stage: Jane's Addiction, Social Distortion, Seether, Puddle of Mudd, Flogging Molly, The Airborne Toxic Event, New Politics.Side Stage: The Dirty Heads, Evans Blue, Red Jumpsuit Apparatus, Middle Class Rut, My Darkest Days, Young the Giant, Electric Touch.
Buzzfest XXVII Saturday, October 22, 2011Cynthia Woods Mitchell PavilionMain Stage: thelastplaceyoulook, Filter, Evans Blue, Everlast, Chevelle, Staind, Bush.Side Stage: Kyng, Anberlin, Switchfoot, Sleeper Agent, Awolnation (Cancelled), P.O.D., 10 Years.
Buzzfest XXVIII Saturday, April 21, 2012Cynthia Woods Mitchell PavilionMain Stage: The Features, Foxy Shazam, Mutemath, Cage the Elephant, Blue October, Evanescence, Korn.Side Stage: Aranda, Hurt, Dead Sara, Band of Skulls, Neon Trees, Dirty Heads, Evans Blue.
Buzzfest XXIX Saturday, October 6, 2012Cynthia Woods Mitchell PavilionMain Stage: thelastplaceyoulook, Hanni El Khatib, Tremonti, Dead Sara, 10 Years, The Toadies, Three Days Grace.Side Stage: The Stone Foxes, Atlas Genius, Red Jumpsuit Apparatus, Saving Abel, Lit, Hollywood Undead, Silversun Pickups.
Buzzfest XXX Saturday, April 20, 2013Cynthia Woods Mitchell PavilionMain Stage: A Silent Film, Beware of Darkness, Sick Puppies, Papa Roach, Stone Sour, Bush, Shinedown.Side Stage: The Virginmarys, I Am Dynamite, Youngblood Hawke, Oleander, The Dirty Heads, Hollywood Undead, P.O.D.
Buzzfest XXXI Saturday, November 2, 2013Cynthia Woods Mitchell PavilionMain Stage: The Virginmarys, I Am Dynamite, New Politics, The Dirty Heads, Blue October, Chevelle, Stone Temple Pilots.Side Stage: Nico Vega, Middle Class Rut, The Mowgli's, Oleander, 10 Years, Cage the Elephant.
Buzzfest XXXII Saturday, October 18, 2014Cynthia Woods Mitchell PavilionMain Stage: Milky Chance, Big Data, Switchfoot, Young the Giant, Cage the Elephant, Papa Roach, Chevelle.Side Stage: New Medicine, Bad Suns, Bear Hands, New Politics, Evans Blue, The Dirty Heads, P.O.D.
Buzzfest XXXIII Saturday, April 18, 2015Cynthia Woods Mitchell PavilionMain Stage: Godsmack, Breaking Benjamin, AWOLNATION, Buckcherry, Joywave, Young Guns, Not In The Face.Side Stage: The Dirty Heads, Hollywood Undead, New Politics, Robert DeLong, Art Alexakis, I Am Dynamite, Within Reason.
Buzzfest XXXIV Saturday, October 17, 2015Cynthia Woods Mitchell PavilionMain Stage: Papa Roach, Our Lady Peace, P.O.D., Panic! At The Disco, Big Wreck, The Struts, Wolf Alice.Side Stage: Bring Me the Horizon, Yelawolf, Pop Evil, Candlebox, Atlas Genius, Issues, PVRIS.
Buzzfest XXXV Saturday, April 16, 2016Cynthia Woods Mitchell PavilionMain Stage: Cage the Elephant, The Offspring, Blue October, AWOLNATION, Toadies.Side Stage: Everclear, Joy Formidable, Nothing But Thieves, Andrew Watt, Fitz and the Tantrums, The Struts, Big Data, New Beat Fund.
Buzzfest XXXVI Saturday, April 15, 2017Cynthia Woods Mitchell PavilionMain Stage: Godsmack, Breaking Benjamin, Toadies, Filter, Red Sun Rising, Missio, Badflower.Side Stage: P.O.D., New Politics, Highly Suspect, PVRIS, The Unlikely Candidates, Dreamers, Bleeker.
Buzzfest XXXVII Saturday, October 27, 2018Cynthia Woods Mitchell PavilionMain Stage: A Perfect Circle, Chevelle, Scott Stapp, The Struts, Badflower, Grandson, Bear Hands.Side Stage: Dirty Heads, Mike Shinoda, Puddle of Mudd, The Nixons, The Blue Stones, Hold On Hollywood, Jacob Kulick

References

External links
 Official site for 94.5 KTBZ (Houston)
 Official site for 102.9 WBUZ (Nashville)
 

Rock festivals in the United States